Săhăteni is a commune in Buzău County, Muntenia, Romania. It is composed of four villages: Găgeni, Istrița de Jos, Săhăteni and Vintileanca.

It is known for its vineyards, being located in the Dealu Mare hills region, close to Pietroasele and Valea Călugărească.

References

Communes in Buzău County
Localities in Muntenia